Grand Ayatollah Ali Asghar Rahimi Azad (Persian:  علی اصغر رحیمی آزاد) (born 1939) is an Iranian Twelver Shi'a Marja.

He published a personal Resalah. His office is currently in Qom.

References

External links
پیام آیت الله رحیمی آزاد به مناسبت رحلت حضرت آیة الله منتظری (ره)

See also
List of Maraji

Iranian grand ayatollahs
Iranian Islamists
Shia Islamists
1939 births
Living people